The Otoe (Chiwere: Jiwére) are a Native American people of the Midwestern United States. The Otoe language, Chiwere, is part of the Siouan family and closely related to that of the related Iowa, Missouria, and Ho-Chunk tribes.

Historically, the Otoe tribe lived as a semi-nomadic people on the Central Plains along the bank of the Missouri River in Nebraska, Kansas, Iowa, and Missouri. They lived in elm-bark lodges while they farmed, and used tipis while traveling, like many other Plains tribes. They often left their villages to hunt buffalo.

In the early 19th century, many of their villages were destroyed due to warfare with other tribes. European-American encroachment and disease also played a role in their decline. Today, Otoe people belong to the federally recognized tribe, the Otoe-Missouria Tribe of Indians, headquartered in Red Rock, Oklahoma.

History

The Otoe were once part of the Ho-Chunk and Siouan-speaking tribes of the Western Great Lakes and Upper Midwest. Around the 16th century, successive groups split off and migrated west and south. These became distinct tribes, the Otoe, the Missouria, and the Ioway. The Otoe settled in the lower Nemaha River valley. They adopted the horse culture and semi-nomadic lifestyle of the Great Plains, making the American bison central to their diet and culture.

European contact
When the Lewis and Clark Expedition headed up the Missouri River to explore the new territory the Otoe were the first tribe they encountered. They met at a place on the west bank of the Missouri River that would become known as the Council Bluff.

Like other Great Plains tribes, the Otoe periodically left their villages to hunt for bison. Between 1817 and 1841, the Otoe lived around the mouth of the Platte River in present-day Nebraska. Otoe County, Nebraska still bears their name. During this time, the Missouria families that survived European diseases and encroachment rejoined them to form the Otoe-Missouri tribe. They gathered with others to trade for European goods.

In the 1830s, European-American traders tried to influence tribal members through alcohol.  As their dependence on alcohol grew, the men no longer hunted, but resorted to looting vacant Pawnee villages while the people were out hunting. Christian missionaries built a mission there.

In 1854 the Otoe-Missouria ceded most of their lands south of the Platte River in eastern Nebraska to the U.S. by treaty.  They retained the Oto Reservation along the Big Blue River on the present Kansas-Nebraska border.  They struggled to adapt to reservation life.

Move to Indian Territory

During the 1870s, the tribe split into two factions. The Coyote band favored an immediate move to Indian Territory, where they believed they could better perpetuate their traditional tribal life outside the influence of the whites. The Quaker band favored remaining on the Big Blue River land. They were willing to sell the western half of the reservation to whites to gain income for a tribal annuity.

By the spring of 1880, about half the tribe had left the reservation and taken up residence with the Sac and Fox Nation in Indian Territory. By the next year, in response to dwindling prospects of self-sufficiency and continued pressure from white settlers, the remaining Otoe members in Nebraska sold the Big Blue reservation.  They migrated to Oklahoma.

With the Otoe-Missouria already there, they purchased a new reservation in the Cherokee Outlet in the Indian Territory.  This is in present-day Noble and Pawnee Counties, Oklahoma.  Today the Otoe-Missouria Tribe of Indians is federally recognized.  It is based in Red Rock, Oklahoma.

Notable Otoe
 Della Warrior, director, New Mexico Museum of Indian Arts and Culture
 Annette Arkeketa, poet and playwright
 Benjamin West, (Otoe & Southern Cheyenne) Buffalo Clan & Bow String Society (b. 1978) Emmy Award photojournalist, photographer & digital artist. Creator of "The Arkeketa Project".
 Chono Ca Pe, early 19th-century leader
 Hayne Hudjihini, or Eagle of Delight (ca. 1795–1822), wife of Sų Manyi Kathi
 Johny Hendricks, MMA fighter
 Tommy Morrison, former heavyweight boxer and co-star in Rocky V movie
 Sų Manyi Kathi, or Prairie Wolf (ca. 1785–1837), sub-chief and diplomat
 Anna Lee Walters, author

See also
Fort Atkinson (Nebraska)
Woodcliff Burials

Notes

External links

Ioway-Otoe Language, Ioway Cultural Institute; Baxoje, the Ioway Nation, on NativeWeb
Otoe-Missouria Genealogy, Database of members and descendants from reservation, Native Website

 
Siouan peoples
Native American tribes in Iowa
Native American tribes in Missouri
Native American tribes in Oklahoma
Native American tribes in Nebraska
Plains tribes